Alexis Tapsell (born 24 April 1986) is a New Zealand rugby union player. She represented New Zealand at the 2013 Rugby World Cup Sevens in Russia. In 2015, she was named in the Black Ferns sevens squad to the Women's Sevens Series. She missed out on selection for the 2015 Dubai Women's Sevens due to a neck injury.

References 

1986 births
Living people
New Zealand female rugby union players
New Zealand female rugby sevens players
New Zealand women's international rugby sevens players